Lakeland Christian Academy is the name of several schools in the United States or Canada:
 Lakeland Christian Academy (Alberta), in Cold Lake, Alberta, Canada
 Lakeland Christian Academy (Kentucky), in Moorehead, Kentucky, USA
 Lakeland Christian Academy (Texas), in Lewisville, Texas, USA
 Lakeland Christian Academy (Indiana), in Winona Lake, Indiana, USA

See also 
 Lakeland Christian School
 Lakeland (disambiguation)